A , sometimes referred to as a small motorcycle, is one of the vehicle categories in the Road Traffic Act of Japan. Such vehicles (motorcycles) have a displacement of more than 50 cc but no more than 125 cc, or their rated output exceeds 0.6 kW but is no more than 1 kW.

In contrast, in the same act, such vehicle with a displacement of more than 50 cc but no more than 400 cc is called a standard two-wheel motor vehicle (普通自動二輪車, futsū jidō nirinsha), or ordinary motorcycle. Thus, a small motorcycle is a subcategory of an ordinary motorcycle.

Meanwhile, a motorcycle with a displacement of over 400 cc is called a large two-wheel motor vehicle (大型自動二輪車, ōgata jidō nirinsha) (heavy motorcycle).

Categories
Some of the vehicle categories under Japanese law are as follows:

License
A license to drive a small motorcycle can be obtained from the age of 16 onward.

Other details

Gallery

References

External links
  Information about acquiring a license (Japan Motorcycle Promotion & Safety Association)

Road transport in Japan
Japan